Temeluchus (probably a garbled transliteration of the Greek Telémakhos; literally, "far-away fighter") is the leader of the tartaruchi, the chief angel of torment (and possibly Satan himself), according to the extracanonical Apocalypse of Paul. In addition to being described as "a merciless angel, all fire," Temeluchus (also called Tartaruchus) has the surprising designation as a caretaking angel set over children at birth or during infancy.

He is mentioned in chapter 15 and chapter 18 as God is rendering judgment:

15 [...] Just is the judgment of God, and there is no respect of persons with God, for whoever has done his mercy he will have mercy on him, and who has not had mercy, neither will God have mercy on him. Let him therefore be delivered to the angel Temeluchus that is set over the torments, and let him cast him into the outer darkness where is weeping and gnashing of teeth, and let him be there until the great day of judgment.

18 [...] Let that soul be delivered into the hands of Temeluchus, and he must be taken down into hell. Let him take him into the lower prison and let him be cast into torments and be left there until the great day of judgment.

In chapter 34, he is seen torturing the soul of a gluttonous and lustful priest:

34 Yet again I looked upon the river of fire, and I saw there an old man who was being dragged along, immersed up to the knees. And Temeluchus came with a great fork of fire with which he pierced the entrails of that old man.

In chapter 40, he is seen tormenting men and women who committed abortion and infanticide:

40 [...] I looked and I saw other men and women upon a spit of fire, and beasts tearing at them, and they were not suffered to say: Lord, have mercy on us. And I saw the angel of torments Temeluchus laying most fierce torments upon them saying: Acknowledge the Son of God. For it was told you before, but when the scriptures of God were read to you, you paid no attention: where the judgment of God is just, for your evil doings have taken hold of you, and brought you into these torments.

His mention in chapter 40 of the Apocalypse of Paul is foreshadowed in the earlier, fragmentary Apocalypse of Peter:

And all they that are in torment will say with one voice: have mercy upon us, for now we know the judgment of God, which he declared to us before, and we didn't believe. And the angel Temeluchus will come and chastise them with yet greater torment, and say to them: Now do you repent, when it is no longer the time for repentance, and nothing of life remains.

Temeluchus' name is sometimes rendered as Aftemelouchos, Aftemeloukhos, Tartaruchus, Tatirokos, Temelouchos, and T'ilimyakos. 

He appears again in 2 Meqabyan 12:13 (considered canonical in the Ethiopian Orthodox Church), just as the evil king Tsirutsaydan is proclaiming his own immortality:

And before he finished speaking this thing, the Angel of Death whose name is called T'ilimyakos alighted and struck his heart. He died in that hour. As he didn't praise his Creator, he was separated from his beautiful lifestyle and perished, arising from the abundance of his arrogance and the evil of his works.

See also
 List of angels in theology

References

Angels in Christianity
Demons in Christianity
Satan
Individual angels